Haut-Rhin's 7th constituency (French: Septième circonscription du Haut-Rhin) was a constituency of the French Parliament. It elected one Member of Parliament and was abolished at the 2010 redistricting of French legislative constituencies.  The (pre-2015) cantons of Cernay, Ensisheim and Soultz-Haut-Rhin were attached to the revised 4th constituency, while the canton of Guebwiller was moved to the 2nd.

MPs 

 Charles Haby
1988-1993 Jean-Pierre Baeumler
1993-1997 Michel Habig
1997-2002 Jean-Pierre Baeumler
2002-2012 Michel Sordi

Election results

2007 
In the 2007 French legislative election, Michel Sordi was elected.

References 

French legislative constituencies of Haut-Rhin